This is a list of Capsicum cultivars belonging to the five major species of cultivated peppers (genus Capsicum): C. annuum, C. chinense, C. baccatum, C. frutescens, and C. pubescens. Due to the large and changing number of cultivars, and the variation of cultivar namings in different regions, this list only gives a few examples of the estimated 50,000 pepper varieties that exist.

Capsicum cultivars 
There are perhaps fifty thousand Capsicum cultivars grown worldwide. The USDA-ARS GRIN seed collection contains 6,200 Capsicum accessions alone, including 4,000 Capsicum annuum accessions. The other Capsicum species in the USDA germplasm repository include: C. chinense, C. baccatum, C. frutescens, C. pubescens, C. cardenasii, C. chacoense, C. flexuosum, C. eximium, C. rhomboideum, C. galapagoense, and C. tovarii.

There are five major species of cultivated Capsicum, C. annuum, C. chinense, C. baccatum, C. frutescens, C. pubescens, and within those species are several "taxonomic varieties". Because of the ability of many of species to cross and generate inter-specific hybrids, albeit with low success, there are also what is referred to as "complexes" within the genus Capsicum of closely related and sexually compatible species. This includes the Capsicum annuum complex, which consists of C. annuum, C. frutescens, and C. chinense.

Major species and their taxonomic varieties:
Capsicum annuum, which includes bell peppers, cayennes, friggitello, jalapeños, paprika, and serrano.
Capsicum annuum 'New Mexico Group', common name Hatch or Anaheim, which includes Big Jim, Chimayó, and Sandia peppers.
Capsicum baccatum, which includes the South American varieties, such as ají amarillo, ají limón, and criolla sella.
Capsicum chinense, which includes all of the habaneros, Scotch bonnets, Trinidad Scorpions, the Bhut Jolokia, and the Carolina Reaper.
Capsicum frutescens, which includes the Tabasco pepper and many of the peppers grown in India; sometimes not distinguished as a species separate from C. annuum.
Capsicum pubescens, which includes the rocoto and manzano pepper, are distinctive plants, having violet flowers, black seeds, and hairy dark green leaves, and grow as a large, multi-stemmed vine up to 5 meters long.

Cultivars 
The species and varieties include many economically important cultivars with a variety of different shapes, colors, and flavors that are grown for different purposes, such as spices, vegetables, and herbal medicines. Some confusion has resulted from the legal term "plant variety", which is used interchangeably with "cultivar" (not with "taxonomic variety"). The terminology around a cultivar also includes terms such as heirloom, open-pollinated, self-pollinating, and hybrid.

Heirloom varieties are typically those that have been selected and grown historically with seeds saved every year, and are still maintained today in similar fashion, such as the blocky-type California Wonder. Open-pollinated varieties are those that are maintained without strict barriers to prevent outcrossing and then seed is collected at and stored from each harvest such as the lamuyo-type Marconi Yellow. While open-pollinated varieties are typically true-to-type, there may be occasional outcrossing to other Capsicum varieties that may introduce some heterogeneity. Self-pollinated varieties are similar to open-pollinated varieties in that they are true-to-type and seed is collected at and stored from each harvest, but measures are taken to minimize outcrossing. This may involve placing a barrier such as a mesh bag or cage over the plant to prevent pollinators from reaching flowers, ensuring that the plant has "selfed". This is how much seed intended for home-garden use is produced, like the cultivar Early Jalapeño. These three types of cultivar seed production are all similar in that only one parent is used and the seed are produced generally through self-pollination.

Hybrid varieties take advantage of a phenomenon called heterosis or hybrid vigor, which occurs in pepper. To generate a hybrid variety, two self-pollinated varieties are intentionally crossed, and all seed from this cross are collected. The new hybrid variety typically is more vigorous than either of the two parents contributing to traits such as higher yield. Inter-specific crossing may result in a hybrid of diminished fertility due to specific genetic incompatibilities. In some cases, this may be overcome by deliberately selecting which of the two parents is to be the female parent in the cross. Hybrid seed if saved will not produce a homogeneous set of plants the next generation, meaning that the two parents will need to be crossed again to generate more hybrid seed. This method is used to produce hybrid Capsicum cultivars such as the blocky types Double-Up and Orange Blaze. Much of the commercial pepper production uses hybrid varieties for their improved traits.

Capsicum annuum

Capsicum annuum, native from southern North America through Central America to South America, has been cultivated by Indigenous peoples of the Americas for thousands of years, and globally for over 400 years. Its fruit forms are varied, from large to small, sweet to sour, and very hot/pungent to bland. Despite being a single species, C. annuum has many forms, with a variety of names, even in the same language. Official names aside, in American English, any variety lacking heat is colloquially known as a sweet pepper, and those sweet peppers that have a blocky shape are referred to as bell peppers. A variety that produces capsaicin is colloquially known as a hot pepper or chili pepper. In British English, the sweet varieties are called "peppers" and the hot varieties "chillies", whereas in Australian English and Indian English, the name "capsicum" is commonly used for bell peppers exclusively and "chilli" is often used to encompass the hotter varieties.

The plant is a tender perennial subshrub, with a densely branched stem. The plant reaches . Single white flowers develop into the fruit, which is typically green when unripe, but may lack chlorophyll causing a white color. Ripening fruits usually change to red, although some varieties may ripen to yellow, orange, peach, brown, or purple. The species are grown in temperate climates as an annual, but they are especially productive in warm and dry climates.

Capsicum baccatum

These have a distinctive, fruity flavor, and are commonly ground into colorful powders for use in cooking, each identified by its color.

Capsicum chinense

Capsicum chinense or "Chinese capsicum" is a misnomer since all Capsicum species originated in the New World. Nikolaus Joseph von Jacquin (1727–1817), a Dutch botanist, named the species in that way in 1776 because he believed they originated in China. Most of the peppers of this species have a distinctive flavor and are similar in flavor to each other.

Capsicum frutescens
 Sometimes considered to be the same species as C. annuum

Capsicum pubescens

Capsicum pubescens is among the oldest of domesticated peppers, and was grown as long as 5,000 years ago. It is probably related to undomesticated plants that still grow in South America (C. cardenasii, C. eximium, and others).

See also 

 International Code of Nomenclature for Cultivated Plants
 USDA National Plant Germplasm System
 New Mexico State University: Chile Pepper Institute

Notes

References

Further reading
G6CSY chile database: Used as source for information on various cultivars in this article.
chillisgalore database: More can be found here.
NMSU Chile Pepper Institute list of chile cultivars

Lists of foods
Lists of cultivars